Lake Central Airlines was an airline that served points in the midwestern and eastern United States from 1950 to 1968, when it merged into Allegheny Airlines. In 1979 Allegheny became USAir. In 1997 USAir became US Airways. In 2015 US Airways was acquired by American Airlines.

History
The airline was founded as Turner Airlines in 1948; it was based at Weir Cook Airport (now Indianapolis International Airport) in Indianapolis, Indiana.  Lake Central's network in the 1950s extended from Chicago to Pittsburgh; in August 1953 it scheduled flights to 21 airports and in May 1968 to 39.

Like other local service airlines regulated by the federal Civil Aeronautics Board, Lake Central was subsidized; in 1962 its revenue of $10.8 million included $4.2 million of "pub. serv. rev.".

In February 1955 Lake Central Airlines became the first employee-owned scheduled airline in the history of the air transport industry. 162 employees (65% of the total) bought 97.5% of the outstanding stock, 25% outright and the rest financed over 24 months.

Effective July 1, 1968, the airline was acquired by and merged into Allegheny Airlines. Allegheny later closed the Indianapolis base and sold the Nord 262s, which had proven unreliable.  Lake Central had planned on acquiring new Boeing 737-200s but the order was cancelled.

Fleet
It flew Douglas DC-3s, Convair 340s, Convair 580s, Beechcraft Bonanzas, and Nord 262s. DC-3 flights ended in 1967 and by spring 1968 Lake Central had an all-turboprop fleet of Convair 580s and Nord 262s.

Historical fleet

Lake Central Airlines previously operated the following aircraft:

 8 Convair CV-340
 4 Convair CV-580
 1 Curtiss C-46 Commando (N1802M)
 14 Douglas DC-3
 5 Douglas C-47 Skytrain
 3 Douglas C-53 Skytrooper
 12 Nord 262A

Destinations in 1968
Shortly before the merger into Allegheny Airlines, Lake Central was serving the following cities with an all-turboprop fleet consisting Convair 580 and Nord 262 aircraft according to its April 28, 1968 timetable:

 Akron/Canton, Ohio
 Baltimore, Maryland
 Bloomington, Indiana
 Buffalo, New York
 Charleston, West Virginia
 Chicago, Illinois (Chicago O'Hare Airport)
 Cincinnati, Ohio - hub
 Clarksburg, West Virginia
 Cleveland, Ohio
 Columbus, Ohio - hub
 Danville, Illinois
 Dayton, Ohio
 Detroit, Michigan
 Elkins, West Virginia
 Erie, Pennsylvania
 Evansville, Indiana
 Grand Rapids, Michigan
 Indianapolis, Indiana - hub & airline headquarters
 Kalamazoo, Michigan
 Kokomo, Indiana
 Lafayette, Indiana
 Lima, Ohio
 Louisville, Kentucky
 Mansfield, Ohio
 Marion, Indiana
 Martinsburg, West Virginia
 Morgantown, West Virginia
 Muncie, Indiana
 Parkersburg, West Virginia
 Pittsburgh, Pennsylvania
 Portsmouth, Ohio
 St. Louis, Missouri
 South Bend, Indiana
 Terre Haute, Indiana
 Toledo, Ohio
 Washington, D.C. (Washington National Airport)
 Wheeling, West Virginia
 Youngstown, Ohio
 Zanesville, Ohio

Accidents and incidents
On March 5, 1967, Lake Central Flight 527, a Convair 580, crashed near Marseilles, Ohio, with the loss of all 38 passengers and crew.

See also 
 List of defunct airlines of the United States

References

External links

 Dan Tate's Blog

 
Airlines established in 1950
Airlines disestablished in 1968
Defunct companies based in Indianapolis
Defunct airlines of the United States
US Airways Group
Defunct regional airlines of the United States